Haka, traditional dances of the Māori people, have been used in sports in New Zealand and overseas. Haka are performed to challenge opponents before matches. The dance form has been adopted by the New Zealand national rugby union team, the "All Blacks", and a number of other New Zealand national teams perform before their international matches; some non-New Zealand sports teams have also adopted haka.

History

During 1888–89, the New Zealand Native team toured the Home Nations of the United Kingdom, the first team from a colony to do so. It was originally intended that only Māori players would be selected, but four non-Māori were finally included. As the non-Māori were born in New Zealand, the name "Native" was considered justified. The team performed a haka before the start of their first match on 3 October 1888 against Surrey. They were described as using the words "Ake ake kia kaha" which suggests that the haka was not "Ka Mate".

The "Ka Mate" haka was not well known at this time. In 1900, a newspaper reported New Zealand soldiers in the Boer War chanting "Ka Mate! Ka Mate! Ka ora! Ka ora! Hae-haea! Ha!" The soldiers thought it meant "Kill him! Chop him up! Baste him!"

But during the 1901 Royal Tour, Ngati Kahungunu warriors revived "Ka Mate" when they performed it to welcome the Duke of Cornwall at Rotorua. Newspapers described the full actions of this "ancient ngeri", printing its complete Maori words and an accurate translation. A movie cameraman recorded the performance. "Ka Mate" became famous, and was widely performed throughout New Zealand.

Nevertheless, when New Zealand played its first full international test match against Australia in Sydney in August 1903, the New Zealanders' war cry was "Tena Koe Kangaroo." (full details below)

In 1905 New Zealand made their first tour of Britain. This was the first time the team were referred to as the All Blacks and this particular team also became known as the 'Originals'. It is uncertain whether they performed a haka before every match, but they at least performed "Ka Mate" before their first test, against Scotland, and before the match against Wales. The Welsh crowd, led by the Welsh team, responded by singing the Welsh national anthem.

When a New Zealand Army team played Wales in 1916, the words of "Ka Mate" were included in the printed programme, indicating that the haka was established as an accompaniment to New Zealand rugby teams playing overseas.

The 1924–25 New Zealand rugby team which toured the United Kingdom, Irish Free State, France and Canada and which was nicknamed the Invincibles, performed a haka that was written for them during the voyage to England by two supporters, Judge Frank Acheson of the Native Land Court and Wiremu Rangi of Gisborne. The haka was led by star player George Nēpia. It was performed before all but two of the tour matches. Reporters criticised the team for disappointing the crowd on the two occasions it was not performed.

A pre-match haka was not always performed on All Blacks tours. The team that toured Britain in 1935–36 did not perform one before matches, although they did some impromptu performances at social functions. In the early decades, haka were only rarely performed at home matches, such as the third test of the 1921 Springboks tour, played in Wellington.

"Ka Mate"

The All Blacks are believed to have first performed a choreographed and synchronized version of the "Ka Mate" haka in 1905.

It is said that this Haka was composed by Te Rauparaha of Ngāti Toa to commemorate his escape from death during an incident in 1810. Chased by his enemies, he hid in a food-storage pit under the skirt of a woman. He climbed out to find someone standing over him, who, instead of killing Te Rauparaha, turned out to be another chief friendly to him. In relief, Te Rauparaha performed this ancient haka, which had been performed all through New Zealand for centuries. The story of Te Rauparaha was merely woven into several older stories about this haka, from a rope-hauling chant to beach a 14th-century voyaging waka, a call for unity under one strong leader, and at the end of an erotic wedding-night chant, 'Kikiki Kakaka.' Ka Mate is still used today together with 'Toia Mai' to "haul the waka" of visitors onto a marae.

Performance
The "Ka Mate" rugby haka generally opens with a set of five preparatory instructions shouted by the leader,
before the whole team joins in:

"Tena Koe Kangarū" 1903
Early in July 1903, when the New Zealand players were assembling in Wellington for their Australian tour, The Evening Post reported that "A unique souvenir has been prepared for the New Zealand team by Mr C. Parata. It contains the following warcry":

The Post'''s rugby correspondent later reported that the war-cry was first practised by the New Zealand team in mid-Tasman on Monday 13 July, and first performed "in response to several calls" at their official reception at Sydney on Thursday 16 July. The reported wording and translation were published next day in the Sydney Morning Herald and in the Sunday Times on 19 July 1903, after the first match against NSW.

The New Zealanders played ten matches on the tour (won 10, lost 0, points for 276, points against 13). Presumably the warcry was performed before all their matches although a search in PapersPast only located mention of its use before "the first test match".

"Ko Niu Tireni" 1924

The Invincibles performed this haka during their unbeaten 1924–1925 tour. It was purpose-written on their voyage to Europe by Wiremu Rangi of Gisborne, and revised by Judge Acheson of New Zealand's Native Land Court. It had two verses, but the second verse (Put a few of your famous teams on display, and let's play each other in friendship) was omitted in later matches.

First verse of Ko Niu Tireni, with a 1925 translation

Newspaper reports of early games spoke of the "weird war cry of the visitors" in response to the crowds' singing. Thus the fifth game at Swansea began with 40,000 waiting Welshmen singing Cwm Rhondda, Sospan Fach, Land of My Fathers and then God Save the King, to which the All Blacks responded with a "weird chant led by Nēpia".

But as fame of their unbeaten status spread, so did the status of their haka. At the beginning of their 22nd game in Wales at Llanelli, we read On the appearance of the men in red, 'Sosban Fach' was sung with great enthusiasm. Nēpia then led the All Blacks in their famous war dance, which was very impressive. One could almost hear a pin drop while it was rendered. The crowd again sang 'Sosban Fach' in reply.

 The haka in Finnegans Wake 
Irish writer James Joyce heard the "Ko Niu Tireni" haka performed at the Invincibles' match at Paris in January 1925. He modified some of the words and used them in his word-play novel Finnegans Wake.
Let us propel us for the frey of the fray! Us, us, beraddy!
Ko Niutirenis hauru leish! A lala!
Ko Niutirenis haururu laleish! Ala lala!
The Wullingthund sturm is breaking.
The sound of maormaoring
The Wellingthund sturm waxes fuercilier.
  Finnegans Wake, 2nd ed. 1950, Book II chap iii, page 335.

"Kapa o Pango" 2005 

Overview
Before a Tri Nations match against South Africa on 27 August 2005 at Carisbrook in Dunedin, the All Blacks unexpectedly introduced a new haka, "Kapa o Pango". It featured an extended and aggressive introduction by team captain Tana Umaga highlighted by a drawing of the thumb down the throat. This was interpreted by many as a "throat-slitting" action directed at the opposing team. The All Blacks went on to win the match 31 to 27.

The words to "Kapa o Pango" are more specific to the rugby team than "Ka Mate", referring to the warriors in black and the silver fern.

The new haka was developed by Derek Lardelli of Ngāti Porou by modifying the first verse of "Ko Niu Tirini," the haka used by the 1924 All Blacks. An NZRU press release stated thatKapa o Pango has been over a year in the making, and was created in consultation with many experts in Māori culture. It will serve as a complement to "Ka Mate" rather than a replacement, to be used for 'special occasions'.

Published words and the NZRU explanation

Words chanted on field, and their literal interpretation

The words of both "Kapa o Pango" and "Ko Niu Tireni" are taken from the haka of the earthquake god Ruaumoko, Ko Ruaumoko e ngunguru nei. The lines beginning Ka tū te ihi-ihi... are found in many old haka. Ponga ra, ponga ra is the opening line of 'Te Kiri Ngutu,' an 1880s lament for stolen territory.

Responses and controversies

The haka, while normally enjoyed by spectators, has been criticised as an unsporting attempt to intimidate the opposition before the match begins.  However, most teams accept that the haka is part of rugby's heritage and face up to the All Blacks during its performance, with both teams standing about 10 metres apart. The 2007 Portuguese Rugby team Captain Vasco Uva said of the haka that "[We] faced it, gave it the respect it deserved and it gave us motivation and we knew if it gave them strength, it was also a point of strength for us."

Ignoring the haka is a tactic sometimes used by opposing teams. Famously, the Australian rugby team did a warm up drill well away from the All Blacks during their 1996 test match in Wellington. More recently, the Italian rugby team ignored the haka during a 2007 World Cup Pool Match. All Black team member, Keven Mealamu, said later that in his opinion the snub had backfired and provided motivation to his team.
Australian back David Campese often ignored the haka, most notably in the 1991 World Cup semi-final victory over the All Blacks, when he chose to practice warm-up drills instead of facing the All Blacks.

In 1989, as the All Blacks were performing the haka in Lansdowne Road before playing Ireland, the Irish lined up in a tight V formation to facing New Zealand and then edged closer and closer to the All Blacks. By the time the end of the haka came, captain Willie Anderson was only inches from Buck Shelford's face.

In 1997, Richard Cockerill was disciplined for responding to the haka before the start of an England vs. All Blacks game. Cockerill went toe-to-toe with his opposite number Norm Hewitt while they performed the haka. The referee became so concerned that Hewitt and Cockerill would begin fighting that he pushed Cockerill away from Hewitt. Cockerill went on to say afterwards "I believe that I did the right thing that day," he said. "They were throwing down a challenge and I showed them I was ready to accept it. I'm sure they would rather we did that than walk away." In recent times when the haka is performed against England, it is often drowned out by England fans singing "Swing Low, Sweet Chariot", causing critics to demand respect towards the cultural symbol. Similarly, Ireland fans have recently drowned out the haka by singing "The Fields of Athenry".

In 2005, Australian rugby league player Willie Mason was caught on camera swearing at New Zealand full back Brent Webb during the haka before a Rugby League Tri-Nations match in Auckland. Mason states he was taking exception to Webb, who was born in Cairns, Queensland, Australia performing the traditional haka.

In 2005, the All Blacks agreed to a request from the Welsh Rugby Union to repeat the sequence of events from the original match a century before in 1905. This involved the All Blacks performing the haka after "God Defend New Zealand" and before "Hen Wlad fy Nhadau". For the November 2006 test, the Welsh Rugby Union demanded a repeat of this sequence. The All Blacks refused, and instead chose to perform the haka in their changing room before the match. All Blacks captain Richie McCaw defended the decision by stating that the haka was "integral to New Zealand culture and the All Blacks' heritage" and "if the other team wants to mess around, we'll just do the haka in the shed". The crowd reacted negatively to the lack of the haka and then being shown brief footage of the haka on the screens at the Millennium Stadium.
In 2006, the Seven Network TV channel in Australia aired a commercial which used digital enhancement to add handbags to video of New Zealand rugby players performing the haka. This was inspired by an incident when former All Black captain Tana Umaga struck Hurricanes teammate Chris Masoe over the head with a woman's handbag after the Super 14 final. All Blacks assistant coach Wayne Smith criticised the advertisement, saying "It is insensitive, I think, to Māori and disrespectful of the All Blacks".

The "Kapa o Pango" haka created controversy when the gesture of a thumb drawn down the throat was interpreted by many observers as implying throat slitting. The All Blacks and Māori interpreted it as drawing the breath of life into the heart and lungs ("hauora"). This led to calls for it to be banned, although a poll conducted in July 2006 showed 60 percent support in New Zealand. During Ireland's tour of New Zealand, the NZRU put the haka on a temporary hiatus, to review its appropriateness, by asking the All Blacks not to perform it against Ireland.

In the 2007 Rugby World Cup quarter-finals, France, after having won the coin toss for the choice of uniforms, famously wore the blue/white/red of the French flag and walked up to within a metre of the haka performance, forming a line of opposition to the performance by the All Blacks, who were wearing a predominantly silver uniform (as opposed to the traditional all black). France went on to beat the All Blacks 20–18.

In the 2008 Rugby Autumn Tests, Wales responded to the haka by standing on the pitch refusing to move until the All Blacks did. This resulted in the referee Jonathan Kaplan berating both teams for a full two minutes after the haka had ended until eventually New Zealand captain McCaw instructed his team to break off. After a spirited first half display which ended with Wales leading 9–6, the All Blacks responded positively and won the game 9–29.

Following the final of the 2011 World Cup, the France national team was fined by the IRB for marching to within 10 metres of their All Black opponents during the performance of the haka. To many, this has been viewed as an insult from the IRB.

In the 2019 Rugby World Cup semi-finals, England fanned out across the pitch and adopted a V-shaped formation before the All Blacks began their Haka. As the All Blacks delivered the challenge, several English players crossed the halfway line and stood their ground when officials tried to usher them back. After the match, the IRB issued England with a fine of £2,000 for having have breached World Cup 2019 rules relating to cultural challenges, which states that no players from the team receiving the challenge may advance beyond the halfway line. England went on to win the match 19–7, advancing to meet South Africa in the final, which they would lose 32–12.

Use after matches
New Zealand national sports teams have occasionally performed the haka (usually Ka Mate) as part of their victory celebrations after winning matches. This is not done as a challenge or sign of triumph over the opposing team, but is instead directed at fans and other spectators as a thank you for support. The haka is also occasionally performed in this context to honour individual players achieving important career milestones. This habit is particularly prevalent for the New Zealand national rugby sevens team.

Use by other teams

Other New Zealand sports teams have similarly performed a haka before a match. The tradition of performing a haka before every test match is just as strong with the Kiwis, the New Zealand national rugby league team, performing it before every game. Traditionally they performed the "Ka Mate" haka, but starting at the 2013 Rugby League World Cup they perform a team-specific haka called "Te Iwi Kiwi". It is also performed by the Australian rules football team and Tall Blacks. The New Zealand Māori have performed the 'Timatanga' haka since 2001. In the documentary Murderball, the New Zealand paralympic rugby team can be seen performing a modified version of a haka.

When Munster hosted the All Blacks at Thomond Park, Limerick in November 2008, the four New Zealand players in the Munster team performed their own haka prior to the All Blacks.

At the opening parade of the 2002 Commonwealth Games in Manchester, the New Zealand team
stopped in front of the Queen and performed a haka.

New Zealand teams have attracted some criticism for performing haka, on occasions such as winning a swim relay bronze medal.

In 2009, Ice Blacks did their haka before their ice hockey match against Australia. The Tall Blacks performed the dance prior to its games in the 2014 FIBA tournament, including a contest against the United States, where video of the dance was widely circulated and sparked discussion.

The Black Sticks, the (field) hockey team, also perform a haka.

During the 2013 PDC World Cup of Darts, team New Zealand, consisting of Phillip Hazel and Craig Caldwell performed a haka ahead of their match against Australia.

The high-profile of the All Blacks, and their use of haka has led other Pacific teams to use similar dances from their own cultures, such as the Cibi, Kailao, and Siva tau. Other teams from the Pacific and elsewhere however have performed the "Ka Mate" or "Kapa o Pango" haka. For instance, the "Kapa o Pango" haka was used by the University of Hawaii Warriors in 2006, before they created their own war dance, the "Haa", in the Hawaiian language with original movements.

See also

 Haka in popular culture
 Kapa haka
 Māori music
 Traditional war dances of other rugby nations:
 Cibi (Fiji)
 Hako (Rapa Nui) (Easter Island)
 Kailao or Sipi Tau (Tonga)
 Siva tau (Samoa)
 Aboriginal war dance (Australia)

Notes

References
M. Pōmare, 'Ngāti Toarangatira', Te Ara – the Encyclopedia of New Zealand'', updated 9 June 2006. URL: www.TeAra.govt.nz
'The Haka – In the Beginning', New Zealand Rugby Museum.

External links

 Haka! – Haka Sports site.
 Te Rauparaha and "Ka Mate" – website New Zealand in History

Rugby league in New Zealand
Rugby union in New Zealand
Haka
Māori language
Rugby football culture
Sports culture
Sports culture in New Zealand